USS LST-917 was an  in the United States Navy. Like many of her class, she was not named and is properly referred to by her hull designation.

Construction
LST-917 was laid down on 31 March 1944, at Hingham, Massachusetts, by the Bethlehem-Hingham Shipyard; launched on 6 May 1944; and commissioned on 28 May 1944.

Service history
During World War II, LST-917 was assigned to the Asiatic-Pacific theater. She took part in the Leyte landings in October 1944; Lingayen Gulf landings in January 1945; the Morotai landing in December 1944 and January 1945; the Consolidation and capture of Southern Philippines, the Mindanao Island landings in January 1945; and the Assault and occupation of Okinawa Gunto in March and April 1945.

Following the war, LST-917 performed occupation duty in the Far East until mid-December 1945. She returned to the United States and was decommissioned on 24 May  1946, and struck from the Navy list on 3 July, that same year. On 19 May 1948, the ship was sold to Kaiser Shipyards, Vancouver, Washington, for scrapping.

Awards
LST-917 earned five battle star for World War II service.

Notes

Citations

Bibliography 

Online resources

External links
 

 

LST-542-class tank landing ships
World War II amphibious warfare vessels of the United States
Ships built in Hingham, Massachusetts
1944 ships